2021 in professional wrestling describes the year's events in the world of professional wrestling.

The COVID-19 pandemic severely affected the professional wrestling industry worldwide in 2020, with many promotions presenting shows behind closed doors. Some events were canceled while others were rescheduled to occur in 2021. All Elite Wrestling (AEW) and New Japan Pro-Wrestling reintroduced a limited number of live fans in the second half of 2020, while WWE had live fans at WrestleMania 37 in April 2021. The majority of promotions have continued to present empty arena shows or shows with limited capacity, while AEW and WWE resumed live touring with full capacity crowds in July.

List of notable promotions 
These promotions are holding notable shows throughout 2021.

Calendar of notable shows

January

February

March

April

May

June

July

August

September

October

November

December

Events affected by COVID-19

Postponed events

Canceled events

Notable events
March 15 – AEW Dark: Elevation premiered on YouTube
March 18 –  Under a new agreement between WWE and NBCUniversal, the WWE Network became a premium channel under Peacock in the United States. Following a brief transitional period, the standalone version of the WWE Network in the U.S. shut down on April 4. This did not affect the service outside of the U.S.
April 9 – All Elite Wrestling held its first-ever house show, "The House Always Wins."
May 30 – AEW Double or Nothing is the first major wrestling show to operate at full venue capacity during the COVID-19 pandemic
June 4 – Beginning with this day's episode of Viernes Espectacular, Consejo Mundial de Lucha Libre resumed a live touring schedule after over a year of producing shows in Arena México without full capacity due to the COVID-19 pandemic.
July 7 – Beginning with this day's episode of AEW Dynamite, which aired as a special episode called "Road Rager", All Elite Wrestling resumed a live touring schedule after over a year of producing shows from Daily's Place in Jacksonville, Florida, becoming the first major promotion to resume touring during the COVID-19 pandemic. It was also the first in AEW's "Welcome Back" tour, which continued with Fyter Fest (July 14 and 21) and concluded with Fight for the Fallen (July 28).
July 16 – Beginning with this day's episode of WWE SmackDown, WWE resumed a live touring schedule for their Raw and SmackDown brands after nearly a year of producing shows from the WWE ThunderDome bio-secure bubble.
August 13 – AEW Rampage premiered on TNT, marking the first weekly wrestling series to air Friday nights on a Turner channel since WCW Power Hour in 1994.
August 20 - CM Punk returned to professional wrestling for the first time in seven years on a live special episode of AEW Rampage titled The First Dance.
October 27 – Ring of Honor announced that they were going on hiatus until at least April 2022, and all talent and staff would be released from their contracts after Final Battle in December.

Accomplishments and tournaments

AAA

AEW

AJPW

CMLL

DDT

Dragon Gate

MLW

Gleat

Impact

NJPW

NWA

ROH

Zero1

Noah

WWE

Title changes

AEW

CMLL

DDT

Impact

IWRG

AAA

MLW

NJPW

NWA

ROH

The Crash

WWE
 – Raw
 – SmackDown
 – NXT
 – NXT UK
 – Unbranded

Raw and SmackDown
Raw and SmackDown each have a world championship, a secondary championship, a women's championship, and a male tag team championship.

NXT

NXT UK

Unbranded
These titles are not brand exclusive. The colors indicate the home brand of the champions (names without a color are former WWE wrestlers, Hall of Famers, or non-wrestlers).

Awards and honors

WWE

WWE Hall of Fame

Impact

Impact Hall of Fame

Debuts 
May 3 – Aoi
August 24 – Brutus Creed
August 24 – Julius Creed
December 8 – Hook

Retirements 
January – Lars Sullivan (2015-2021)
March – The Brian Kendrick
April 20 – Kenny Dykstra (2001-2021) 
April 28 – Sadie Gibbs
May 6 – Solo Darling (2011–2021)
June 16 – A. C. H.
June 27 – Matsuya Uno
July 31 - David Arquette (2000-July 31, 2021) 
August 1 – Masato Yoshino
August 22 – Ryo Kawamura
August 28 – Awesome Kong (1999-2021)
November 5 – Sabu (1984-2021)
November 23 – Rina Shingaki (2018–2021)

Deaths 

 January 7 - Bobby Davis (born 1937) 
 January 10 - Danie Voges (born 1954) 
 January 11 - David Khakhaleishvili (born 1971) 
 January 16 – Paul Varelans (born 1969)
 February 1 – Dustin Diamond (born 1977)
 February 5 – Butch Reed (born 1954)
 February 5 – Leon Spinks (born in 1953)
 February 11 – Rusty Brooks (born 1958)
 February 20 – Dean Ho (born 1940)
 February 23 – Art Michalik (born 1930)
 February 26 – Johnny De Fazio (born 1940)
 March 1 – Ann Casey (born 1938)
 March 3 – Jim Crockett Jr. (born 1944)
 March 5 – Buddy Colt (born 1936)
 March 19 – Barry Orton (born 1958)
 April 6 – Jack Veneno (born 1942)
 April 8 – John da Silva (born 1934) 
 May 14 – New Jack (born 1963)
 May 17 – Don Kernodle (born 1950)
 May 24 – Paul Christy (born 1939)
 May 28 – Tony Marino (born 1931)
 June 2 – Pasión Kristal (born 1976)
 June 23 – Melissa Coates (born 1971)
 June 30 – The Patriot (born 1961)
 July 7 – Chris Youngblood (born 1966)
 July 12 – Paul Orndorff (born 1949)
 July 26 – Brazo de Plata (born 1963)
 July 28 – Ted Lewin (born 1935) 
 August 2 – Hideki Hosaka (born 1971)
 August 3 – Jody Hamilton (born 1938)
 August 4 
 – Bobby Eaton (born 1958)
 – Bert Prentice (born 1958)
 August 12 – Dominic DeNucci (born 1932)
 August 14 - Fez Whatley (born 1964) 
 August 21 - Jarvis Astaire (born 1923) 
 August 23 – Brick Bronsky (born 1964)
 September 1
Daffney (born 1975)
Yar (born 1971) 
 September 2 
 – Steve Lawler (born 1965)
 – Ryan Sakoda (born 1974)
 September 7 – Bill White (born 1945)
 September 21 – Rumi Kazama (born 1965)
 October 7 – Reggie Parks (born 1934)
 October 17 – Hido (born 1969)
 November 6 – Angelo Mosca (born 1937)
 November 11 - Buzz Tyler (born 1948) 
 November 14 - John Lees (born 1930)
 November 15 – Estrella Blanca (born 1938)
 November 28 – Pat Barrett (born 1936)
 December 1 – Kal Rudman (born 1930)
 December 8 – Blackjack Lanza (born 1935)
December 13 – Jimmy Rave (born 1982)
December 22 - Corporal Kirchner (born 1957)
December 27 -  Markus Crane (b. 1988)
December 31 - Strong Kobayashi (born 1940)

See also 
 List of WWE pay-per-view and WWE Network events, WWE Raw special episodes, WWE SmackDown special episodes, and WWE NXT special episodes  
 List of AEW pay-per-view events, AEW Dynamite special episodes, and AEW Rampage special episodes
 List of Impact Wrestling pay-per-view events and Impact Plus Monthly Specials
 List of NJPW major events and NJPW Strong special episodes
 List of ROH pay-per-view events
 List of World Wonder Ring Stardom major events
 List of major Pro Wrestling Noah events
 List of major DDT Pro-Wrestling events
 List of MLW events
 List of NWA pay-per-view events
 WWE ThunderDome

References 

 
professional wrestling